Italaphaenops dimaioi is a species of beetle in the family Carabidae, the only species in the genus Italaphaenops.

References

Trechinae